Sandy Frances Duncan is a Canadian writer of novels, mysteries, and short stories. Her novel Gold Rush Orphan was among the finalists for the Sheila A. Egoff Children's Literature Prize in 2005. She has contributed short fiction to anthologies, including Dropped Threads: What We Aren't Told and Celebrating Canadian Women, and to magazines including Makara, Northern Journey, and Canadian Fiction.

Duncan, born in Vancouver in 1942, holds bachelor's and master's degrees from the University of British Columbia. She worked as a psychologist at Woodlands School, New Westminster, British Columbia; Burnaby Mental Health Center in Burnaby, and for the Metropolitan Health Department in Vancouver before turning to writing full-time in 1973.

Bibliography

Novels
 Cariboo Runaway (1976)
 Kap-Sung Ferris (1977)
 The Toothpaste Genie (1981)
 Dragonhunt (1981)
 Finding Home (1982)
 Pattern Makers (1989)
 Listen to Me, Grace Kelly (1990)
 British Columbia: Its Land, Mineral and Water Resources (1996)
 Gold Rush Orphan (2004)

Mysteries
Four novels, co-authored with George Szanto, comprise the Islands Investigations International Mysteries, as follows:
 Never Sleep with a Suspect on Gabriola Island (2009)
 Always Kiss the Corpse on Whidbey Island (2010)
 Never Hug a Mugger on Quadra Island (2011)
 Always Love a Villain on San Juan Island (2013)

References

1942 births
Living people
20th-century Canadian novelists
21st-century Canadian novelists
20th-century Canadian short story writers
Canadian women non-fiction writers
University of British Columbia alumni
Writers from Vancouver
Canadian mystery writers
Women mystery writers
20th-century Canadian women writers